Kistler Group (legal name: Kistler Holding AG (a.k.a. “box”)), with headquarters in Winterthur, is an internationally active Swiss group of companies specializing in the field of measurement technology. The Kistler Group is represented at more than 60 locations in over 30 countries and, although owner-managed, is organized as a listed company. The Kistler Group employs a staff of some 2,050 and generated revenue of 361 million Swiss francs in 2020. Approximately 9% of revenue flows back into research and technology every year.

History
The company was founded by Walter P. Kistler and Hans Conrad Sonderegger in 1959 as the Kistler Instrument Corporation, but the enterprise started in 1950 when Walter Kistler patented a charge amplifier he developed. Hans Conrad Sonderegger is the father of the current (2010) CEO. In 1959 the company became active on the stock market. Since 1961 the company started the in-house production of charge amplifiers and the development of other sensors. The company made several major innovations, some of which would be put to use in the Apollo manned spaceflights, and became a world leader in the development of quartz sensors. Walter Kistler left the company in 1970 and moved to Seattle, Washington.

Field of activity
Kistler develops, manufactures and distributes sensors for measuring pressure, force, torque and acceleration, as well as electronics and software. Kistler specializes in piezoelectric and piezoresistive measurement technology.

High-temperature and ballistic pressure sensors

Kistler measuring systems allow measuring thermoacoustics phenomena in harsh environments with extreme temperatures up to 700 °C. Applications include monitoring of gas turbines and other turbomachinery, R&D of continuous detonation engines, monitoring, and control of pressure oscillations in pipes and acoustic thermometry. Kistler’s durable piezoelectric sensors based on proprietary PiezoStar® KI100 crystal material have been developed specifically for temperatures up to 700 °C. KI100 crystals have no pyroelectric effect.

The piezoelectric sensors (named "channel sensors") from Kistler are also used by the Commission Internationale Permanente pour l'Epreuve des Armes à Feu Portatives (C.I.P.) for proof testing firearms ammunition. These sensors require drilling of the cartridge case before firing the proofing cartridge in a specially made test barrel.	 
For NATO EPVAT testing of military firearms ammunition NATO design EPVAT test barrels with Kistler 6215 and HPI GP6 transducers can be used.
For testing shotshell ammunition Kistler produces one type of piezoelectric sensor (called "tangential sensor")'

Acquisitions
In recent years, the Kistler Group posted strong organic and inorganic growth (achieved through acquisitions). The following companies are part of the Kistler Group:
 AMS Gesellschaft für angewandte Mess- und Systemtechnik mbh (since 2018)
 SMETEC Gesellschaft für Sensor-, Motor- und Energietechnik mbH (since 2018)
 LIK Mechanical and Electrical Technology Co., Ltd. (since 2018)
 Vester Elektronik GmbH (since 2017)
 IOS GmbH (since 2017)
 eso GmbH (since 2017)
 Schatz AG (since 2016)
 Baewert Präzisionsmesstechnik (since 2012)
 MSC  (since 2009)
 Corsys Datron (since 2009)
 KT Automotive GmbH (since 2009)
 Staiger Mohilo (since 2006)
 VELOS Messsysteme (since 2003)
 IGeL GmbH (since 2002)

References

Manufacturing companies of Switzerland
Sensors
Manufacturing companies established in 1950
Privately held companies of Switzerland
Electronics companies of Switzerland
Companies based in Winterthur
Swiss companies established in 1950
Swiss brands